Abrotanella fertis is a member of the daisy family and is an endemic species of New Zealand.

References

Endemic flora of New Zealand
fertilis